Guinea (GUI) has competed in the eight African Games. The country first took part in the second games that took place in 1973, when the team won a gold and a silver medla, the latter in football. The country next appeared twelve years later at the event in 1995. Athletes from Guinea have subsequently won a total of eight other medals, including two silver.

Participation
Guinea first entered the African Games (then called the All-African Games) in 1973. The team came away with a silver medal in the footbsll tournament that year, beating the host nation, Nigeria. The country has not sent teams to the following tournaments, returning in 1995. The country also attended in 2003, 2007, 2015, and, most recently, 2019.

Medal tables

Medals by Games

Below is a table representing all the medals won by Guinea at the Games.

See also 
 Guinea at the Olympics
 Guinea at the Paralympics
 Sport in Guinea

References